North Sea Cup may refer to a number of sports competitions:

 North Sea Cup, a defunct Dutch ice hockey league.
 North Sea Cup (chess), a defunct Danish chess tournament.
 North Sea Cup (rugby union), a rugby union competition for club teams from Belgium, Germany and the Netherlands.

See also
 North Sea Pro Series, a cricket competition featuring teams from the Netherlands and Scotland